Balashov and Balashova (feminine) is a common Russian surname. Notable people with the surname include:

 Alexander Balashov (1770–1837), Russian general and statesman
 Alexandra Balashova (1887—1979), Russian ballet dancer
 Andrey Balashov (1946—2009), Russian sailor
 Boris Balashov (1927—1974), Russian magazine editor
 Hennadiy Balashov (born 1961), Ukrainian businessman and politician
 Roman Balashov (born 1977), Russian water polo player
 Victor Balashov (1924–2021), Russian radio and television presenter
 Vitaliy Balashov (born 1991), Ukrainian football player
 Yuri Balashov (born 1949), Russian chess player

Russian-language surnames